Islington (or Khokhovela) is a settlement in the Ehlanzeni District Municipality in the Mpumalanga Province of South Africa. It is located east of Acornhoek.

See also
 List of populated places in South Africa

References 

Populated places in the Bushbuckridge Local Municipality